Ko Po may refer to:

 Ko Po, an island in Krabi Province, Thailand, part of the Lanta Islands
 Ko Po Tsuen, North District, a village in the North District of Hong Kong
 Ko Po Tsuen, Yuen Long District, a village in the Kam Tin area of Yuen Long District, Hong Kong